Aphthitalite is a potassium sulfate mineral with the chemical formula: (K,Na)3Na(SO4)2.

It was first described in 1835 for an occurrence on Mount Vesuvius, Italy. The name is from the Greek άφθητος, "unalterable", and άλας, "salt", for its stability in air. It occurs as fumarolic incrustations in volcanic environments, as small crystals and masses in evaporite deposits and in guano deposits. It occurs associated with thenardite, jarosite, sylvite and hematite in fumaroles; with blodite, syngenite, mirabilite, picromerite, borax and halite in evaporites; and with syngenite, whitlockite, monetite, niter and gypsum in guano deposits.

References

Sulfate minerals
Potassium minerals
Sodium minerals
Trigonal minerals
Minerals in space group 164